Charles Louis François de Paule de Barentin was a French statesman and Keeper of the Seals of France at the end of the reign of Louis XVI. He was born in Paris on 1 July 1738 and died in Paris on 30 May 1819.

Born into a well-known noble judicial family, de Barentin was  Advocate General of the Parlement of Paris (1757 to 1775), president of the Cour des Aides (1775 to 1788) and became Keeper of the Seals on 14 September 1788, which post he held until 15 July 1789. Four days earlier, on the advice of his privy council, the king had dismissed his populist Director-General of Finances, Jacques Necker. The public outcry led to the storming of the Bastille three days later, and Louis was forced to recall Necker. The king held de Barentin responsible and sacked him.

In November of the same year he was accused by a revolutionary court of conspiring to order troops to fire on the crowd storming the Bastille, but was acquitted, and emigrated to Italy and then England, where he remained until the restoration of the monarchy. He was made honorary chancellor by Louis XVIII.

References and notes
This article is based on the article Charles Louis François de Paule de Barentin from the French Wikipedia, retrieved on November 5, 2008.

1738 births
1819 deaths
Ancien Régime office-holders
French counter-revolutionaries
French Ministers of Justice